The National University of La Rioja (UNLAR) is an Argentine national university, situated in the city of La Rioja, capital of La Rioja Province. Its precursor, the Provincial University of La Rioja, was established in 1972.

See also
 List of universities in Argentina

External links

Science and Education in Argentina
Argentine Higher Education Official Site 

1993 establishments in Argentina
La Rioja
Educational institutions established in 1993
Universities in La Rioja Province, Argentina